Sir John Sparrow David Thompson  (November 10, 1845 – December 12, 1894) was a Canadian lawyer, judge and politician who served as the fourth prime minister of Canada from 1892 until his death. He had previously been fifth premier of Nova Scotia for a brief period in 1882.

Thompson was born in Halifax, Nova Scotia. He trained as a lawyer and was called to the bar in 1865. Thompson was elected to the Nova Scotia House of Assembly in 1877 as a representative of the Conservative Party. He became the provincial attorney general the following year, in Simon Holmes' government, replaced Holmes as premier in 1882. However, he served for only two months before losing the 1882 general election to the Liberal Party. After losing the premiership, he accepted an appointment to the Nova Scotia Supreme Court.

In 1885, Thompson entered federal politics at the personal request of Prime Minister John A. Macdonald, becoming Minister of Justice. In that role he was the driving force behind the enactment of the Criminal Code. Thompson became prime minister in 1892, following the retirement of John Abbott. He was the first Roman Catholic to hold the position. On a trip to England in 1894, Thompson unexpectedly suffered a heart attack and died, aged 49. He is the second and most recent Canadian prime minister to have died in office, after John A. Macdonald.

Early years
Born in Halifax, Nova Scotia, to John Sparrow Thompson and Charlotte Pottinger, he was of Irish descent. Some sources say he was born on November 10, 1845, though others say 1844. Thompson married Annie Affleck (1842–1913) in 1870. Annie Thompson was strong-willed and had the same kind of spirit that had driven Agnes Macdonald (another prime minister's wife) to ride the cowcatcher of a Canadian Pacific Railway train through the British Columbia mountains. During their courtship, Thompson was forced to write love letters in shorthand because of his soon-to-be wife's disapproving parents.  A daughter, Annie, died at 1, while youngest son David lived to be 2. Two other children died at birth, the Thompsons had five children survive childhood.

Law, politics, and professorship

Thompson was called to the Nova Scotia Bar in July 1865, and from 1878 to 1882, he served as Attorney General in the provincial government of Simon H. Holmes. He briefly held the office of Nova Scotia premier in 1882, but his government was defeated in that year's election. Thompson was always a reluctant politician.

After his resignation from government, Thompson was immediately appointed to the Nova Scotia Supreme Court by the Prime Minister Macdonald. In this role, he was instrumental in founding the Dalhousie Law School in 1883. He taught law courses at Dalhousie in its early years.

Federal Minister of Justice
After several failed overtures, Macdonald finally recruited Thompson to Ottawa in 1885. Macdonald generally thought highly of Thompson, remarking, "My one great discovery was my discovery of Thompson". Macdonald poked some fun at his recruit as well: "Thompson is a little too fond of satire, and a little too much of a Nova Scotian." However, his rise in government was probably because of the influence of Lady Aberdeen, the wife of Governor General Aberdeen and Macdonald's mentoring. She had great admiration for Thompson and wrote frequently about him in her "Canadian Journal".

Thompson was sworn in as Minister of Justice in September 1885 and won a seat in Parliament in October, representing Antigonish.

Louis Riel crisis
When he returned to Ottawa, the Louis Riel crisis was in full swing. The question of what to do with Riel, who had been sentenced to hang for leading the 1885 North-West Rebellion, was now the responsibility of Thompson. Although Thompson was ill with kidney stones at the time of Riel's execution, Thompson made his first major speech to Parliament during the subsequent debate by arguing that anyone who encouraged Canadians to act against the state could not escape justice. The speech was notable and helped to popularize Thompson, and he quickly rose to become a leading member of the Conservative government.

His achievements as Minister of Justice included the first Criminal Code, a consolidation and unification of the criminal law for Canada.

Declines post of prime minister as a Roman Catholic
Thompson was the last minister to see Macdonald before his devastating stroke in May 1891. Following Macdonald's death a week later, there was a Cabinet crisis. The governor general, Lord Stanley of Preston, asked Thompson to form a government, but Thompson declined because of religious prejudice against the Roman Catholicism to which he had converted at his marriage. Thompson recommended John Abbott, who ultimately accepted. After 1893 Prince Edward Island House of Assembly passage of the amalgamation "Bill respecting the Legislature," Thompson, still wary of a Protestant backlash, reported to the Canadian Governor General that almost every article of the Prince Edward Island "amalgamation" statute, save for a punitive clause that violated with "little injury" the separation of powers between the Legislative Assembly and provincial court system, was "unobjectionable, and may be left to their operation." In a rejoinder to Neil McLeod (Leader of the Opposition in the provincial legislature), he concluded that there was as much probability of an amendment to increase the supermajority requirement to unanimity (for amending the bill) as there was probability that the entire "section itself may be repealed at any time by statute passed in the ordinary way." Then, in a demonstration that his tenure as Prime Minister would not result in a papal majority government, Thompson disregarded Conservative allegations of gerrymandering of French Acadian and otherwise Roman Catholic voters in Prince Edward Island. In 1894, Lord Stanley "approved" of this report months before Thompson's fatal heart attack.

Prime Minister (1892–1894)
Thompson assumed the office of Prime Minister in 1892, a year later, when John Abbott retired. Thompson retained the post of Attorney General while he was prime minister. 

He came very close to bringing Newfoundland into Confederation, but that would not be achieved until 1949.

His first major speech as Prime Minister was given in Toronto in January 1893 and covered the topics of tolerance and Canadian nationalism in conjunction with loyalty to the British crown. At the time, Thompson was concerned about the possibility of the annexation of Canada by the United States, a goal that was being pursued within Canada by the Continental Union Association, a group of Ontario and Quebec Liberals. Despite his concern, Thompson ultimately realized that the conspiracy to make Canada part of the United States was confined to a small and noisy minority within the opposition party.

In March 1893, Thompson travelled to Paris, France as one of the judges on the tribunal to settle the dispute over the seal harvest in the Bering Sea. The tribunal ruled there was no justification for the American claim that the Bering Sea was closed to all but American seal hunters.

Other matters of concern during Thompson's tenure as Prime Minister included the reduction of trade tariffs and questions over schooling in Manitoba and in the North West Territories, where serious disputes existed over the role of Catholics and Protestants in administering the school system. The issue in the North West Territories would be resolved to Thompson's satisfaction but only after his death.

Supreme Court appointments
While in office, Thompson chose the following jurists to sit as justices of the Supreme Court of Canada:
 Sir Samuel Henry Strong (as Chief Justice, December 13, 1892 – November 18, 1902; appointed a Puisne Justice under Prime Minister Mackenzie, September 30, 1875)
 Robert Sedgewick – (February 18, 1893 – August 4, 1906)
 George Edwin King – (September 21, 1893 – May 8, 1901)

Death in office

Thompson had been Prime Minister of Canada for only two years when he died suddenly from a heart attack at the age of 49 on December 12, 1894. He was at England's Windsor Castle, where Queen Victoria had just made him a member of her Privy Council. Thompson's physical condition had deteriorated during his time in Ottawa; he was significantly overweight when he died (standing , he weighed about ), and had always pushed himself very hard in his work.

Thompson was the second of two Canadian prime ministers to die in office (the first being John A. Macdonald), and the first of three who did not die in Canada (the other two being Charles Tupper and Richard Bedford Bennett).

After an elaborate funeral was staged for him in the United Kingdom by Queen Victoria, Thompson's remains were transported back to Canada aboard the armoured cruiser , which was painted black for the occasion. He was buried on January 3, 1895, in the Holy Cross Cemetery in Halifax, Nova Scotia.

Despite having held prime ministerial office, Thompson had little estate, so Parliament set up a fund to support his widow and children. The Canadian politician Margaret Mitchell, who died March 8, 2017, is considered the last of Thompson's descendants.

Family

Thompson, then a young barrister, married in 1870 Annie E. Affleck, daughter of John Affleck, of Halifax, Nova Scotia, and his wife, Catherine Saunders. Annie was born and educated in Halifax, Nova Scotia. The couple had nine children, only five of whom survived early childhood. After she was widowed December 12, 1894, a fund of $30,000 was raised for Lady Thompson, headed by Lord Strathcona with a subscription of $5,000; the Parliament of Canada contributed $25,000. The Governor-General, the Earl of Aberdeen undertook the education of the sons. Lady Thompson cofounded, with the Countess of Aberdeen, the National Council of Women, and served as one of its presidents. She served as a governor of the Victorian Order of Nurses. As a widow, she lived at Derwent Lodge, 631 Sherbourne Street in Toronto.

Legacy
Thompson was designated a Person of National Historic Significance in 1937. His collected papers were donated in 1949 to the National Archives of Canada by his son, Colonel John Thompson.

A ranking of the Canadian Prime Ministers was published by J.L. Granatstein and Norman Hillmer in 1997. A survey of 26 Canadian historians determined that Thompson was ranked #10 of the 20 people who had at that time served as Canadian PM. He was identified as "The great "might-have-been" of Canadian Prime Ministers...", whose potentially promising career was cut short by his early death. A follow-up article co-authored by Hillmer in 2011 broadened the survey to include survey responses of over 100 historians; in this survey, Thompson was ranked 14th out the 22 who had by then served as PM.

The high school in the Canadian sitcom Life with Derek, SJST, is named after Thompson. Sir John Thompson Catholic Junior High School in Edmonton is named for him. Thompson appears as a prominent character in Paul Marlowe's novel Knights of the Sea (set in 1887 when Thompson was Minister of Justice).

Since 1996, Sir John Thompson's former home in Ottawa at 237 Metcalfe Street has served as the national office of the Canadian Soccer Association.

Nova Scotian artist William Valentine painted Thompson's portrait.

See also

 List of prime ministers of Canada
 List of books about prime ministers of Canada

Notes

References
 
 
 J. P. Heisler, 1955, Sir John Thompson, thesis, University of Toronto.
 J. Castell Hopkins, 1895, Life and Work of the Rt. Hon. Sir John Thompson, Toronto: United Publishing Houses.

Attribution

External links

 
Sir John Thompson fonds at Library and Archives Canada
Photograph: Funeral cortege of Sir John D. Thompson, 1895 – McCord Museum

1845 births
1894 deaths
Canadian Roman Catholics
Canadian Knights Commander of the Order of St Michael and St George
Canadian King's Counsel
Converts to Roman Catholicism from Methodism
Academic staff of the Dalhousie University
Lawyers in Nova Scotia
Leaders of the Conservative Party of Canada (1867–1942)
Members of the House of Commons of Canada from Nova Scotia
Canadian members of the Privy Council of the United Kingdom
Members of the King's Privy Council for Canada
Progressive Conservative Association of Nova Scotia MLAs
People from Halifax, Nova Scotia
Pre-Confederation Nova Scotia people
Attorneys General of Nova Scotia
Premiers of Nova Scotia
Prime Ministers of Canada
Persons of National Historic Significance (Canada)
Nova Scotia political party leaders